The Flatiron Building on Battery Park Avenue in Asheville, North Carolina was completed in 1927. The nine-story 52,000-square-foot building was designed by New York City architect Albert C. Wirth and built by L. B. Jackson Builders of Asheville. It is a contributing building to the Downtown Asheville Historic District.  Midtown Development Associates bought the building in 1985 for $440,000. A $1 million renovation took place at that time. Early in 2018, building manager  and co-owner Russell Thomas said the building was for sale with a $16 million asking price but the buyer would be required to keep the building essentially the same as it was. On October 8, 2018, Thomas announced the building needed $3.5 million in renovations. Developer Philip Woollcott has a plan for converting the building from offices to a hotel.

References

External links 

 Emporis

Buildings and structures in Asheville, North Carolina
Buildings and structures completed in 1927
Beaux-Arts architecture in North Carolina
Flatiron buildings